Milton Coates was a cotton weigher who served as a state legislator and post office clerk in Mississippi. He represented Warren County, Mississippi in the Mississippi House of Representatives from 1882 to 1885. A Republican, he lived on south Farmer Street in Vicksburg.

He was a defendant in a lawsuit regarding the weighing of cotton by the city of Vicksburg. His apppintment as a post office clerk in Vicksburg by Henry Roberts Pease was illicited objections because Coates was African American.

See also
 African-American officeholders during and following the Reconstruction era

References

Year of birth missing
African-American politicians during the Reconstruction Era
Members of the Mississippi House of Representatives
African-American state legislators in Mississippi
Year of death missing
Politicians from Vicksburg, Mississippi